The Bistrița (Hungarian: Beszterce) is a river in the Romanian region of Transylvania, Bistrița-Năsăud County. It is sometimes referred to as Bistrița ardeleană. Near the city of Bistrița (at the village Sărata) it flows into the Șieu, a tributary of the Someșul Mare.

The upper reach of the river, upstream of the junction with the Bârgău in the village of Prundu Bârgăului is also known, locally, as Bistricioara.

Towns and villages

The following towns and villages are situated along the river Bistrița, from source to mouth: Colibița, Bistrița Bârgăului, Prundu Bârgăului, Josenii Bârgăului, Livezile, Bistrița

Tributaries

The following rivers are tributaries to the river Bistrița:

Left: Pănuleț, Repedea, Pârâul Stegii, Șoimu de Sus, Șoimu de Jos, Pietroasa, Poiana, Tănase, Fânațele, Ghinda

Right: Izvorul Lung, Bârgău, Valea Muntelui, Muncel, Iad, Slătinița, Valea Rus, Tărpiu

References

Rivers of Romania
Rivers of Bistrița-Năsăud County